From the Pacific Coast League's foundation in 1903, many of its teams relocated, changed names, transferred to different leagues, or ceased operations altogether.  For the 2021 season, the league operated as the Triple-A West before switching back to its previous moniker in 2022.

Teams

Map

See also

List of American Association (1902–1997) teams
List of International League teams

References

External links

Pacific Coast League teams
 
 
Pacific Coast League